Maurice "Matt" Woods (1 November 1931 – 26 September 2014) was a professional footballer who played for Everton, Blackburn Rovers, Sydney Hakoah, Luton Town and Stockport County.

References

1931 births
2014 deaths
People from Skelmersdale
English footballers
Association football central defenders
Burscough F.C. players
Everton F.C. players
Blackburn Rovers F.C. players
Hakoah Sydney City East FC players
Luton Town F.C. players
Stockport County F.C. players
Drumcondra F.C. players
Altrincham F.C. players
English Football League players
League of Ireland players
FA Cup Final players